Marc Büchler (1929 – 1980) was a Swiss equestrian. He competed in two events at the 1956 Summer Olympics.

References

1929 births
1980 deaths
Swiss male equestrians
Olympic equestrians of Switzerland
Equestrians at the 1956 Summer Olympics
Place of birth missing
20th-century Swiss people